Halabja District may refer to:

 Halabja, a district of the Halabja Governorate
 Halabja District, Sulaymaniyah Governorate, a former district

See also

 Halabja Governorate